The Digital IXUS (IXY Digital in Japan and PowerShot Digital ELPH in US and Canada) is a series of digital cameras released by Canon. It is a line of ultracompact cameras, originally based on the design of Canon's IXUS/IXY/ELPH line of APS cameras.

History
Canon's PowerShot A and S line of the time were being made as small as contemporary technology allowed, and demonstrated the demand for a small digital camera of good quality. Canon used its experience with small film cameras, particularly the APS IXUS, to mass-produce good digital cameras smaller than anyone else had managed up to the time (the first Digital IXUS was the smallest 2MP then available) and reused the popular IXUS/IXY/ELPH brand name with the tag line "The DIGITAL IXUS blends Canon's award-winning IXUS design with PowerShot digital technology."

The first Digital IXUS, released in June 2000 fitted the technology of the PowerShot S10 into a body similar to the APS IXUS II. Between 2003 and 2004, starting with the Digital IXUS II, Canon moved from the use of CF cards to SD cards to create thinner cameras.

Several models have found favor within the Kite Aerial Photography (KAP) community due to a unique combination of small size/ low weight, excellent image quality with stabilization, and the option of expanded manual control including intervalometer functionality available via 3rd party CHDK.

G-series in a compact body 
The IXUS 900Ti was the first in a series of IXUS and S-series cameras that feature the Digic image processors and larger than average sensors as fitted to the advanced PowerShot G-series cameras. The IXUS / S-series and the equivalent G-series models are listed below:

 IXUS 900 Ti (SD900)* / PowerShot G7 / Digic III / 10MP 3648 × 2736 1/1.8″ CCD.
 IXUS 960 IS (SD950IS)* / PowerShot G9 / Digic III / 12.1MP 4000 × 3000 1/1.7″ CCD.
 IXUS 980 IS (SD990IS) / PowerShot G10 / Digic 4 / 14.7MP 4416 × 3312 1/1.7″ CCD.
 PowerShot S90, S95, S200 / PowerShot G11, G12 / Digic 4 / 10MP 3648 × 2736 1/1.7″ CCD (S200 features Digic 5).
 PowerShot S100, S110 / PowerShot G15 / Digic 5 / 12.1MP 4000×3000 1/1.7" CMOS.
 Powershot S120 / PowerShot G16 / Digic 6 / 12.1MP 4000×3000 1/1.7" CMOS.

(* The IXUS 900Ti and 960IS feature a titanium body.)

Models
This article uses the Digital IXUS model names unless otherwise stated.  The comparison tables in this article list equivalent IXY Digital and PowerShot Digital ELPH model names.

The same camera models are released in Europe, the US, and Japan under different names. The cameras themselves are identical apart from the front fascia, according to the parts lists. The Canon model number on the bottom is consistent between marketing names.

All models use lithium ion batteries of Canon proprietary design, though third-party equivalents are readily available.

All models introduced before 2010 use RGBG Bayer filter (except the original Digital IXUS, which uses a CYGM filter) CCD sensors made by Sony. IXUS 300 HS/PowerShot Digital ELPH SD4000 IS/IXY 30S introduced in May 2010 and all following models have back-illuminated CMOS sensor. Images are recorded as JPEGs. Raw image files are not accessible without the use of third party firmware such as CHDK.

In 2010, Canon dropped the prefix "Digital" as well as suffix "IS" (Image Stabilization) from the names of the new models e.g. IXUS 105. A similar change was applied to the IXY-series names used in the Japanese market. The United States market naming was simplified in 2011: "Digital" and "IS" were removed as well as "SD" prefix. Newer US and European model carry "HS" suffix, that stands for "high sensitivity".

The Digital IXUS series slots above the PowerShot A in Canon's point-and-shoot lineup, with models in the Digital IXUS range commanding a considerable price premium. However, since the late 2000s, with the falling prices of Digital IXUS models in Canadian and U.S. markets, they have become among some of the lower-priced models available as PowerShot A models are gradually withdrawn from the market and not replaced.

IXUS/ELPH/IXY cameras using CF storage
The PowerShot Digital ELPH using CF have Sxxx model number.

IXUS 400
The Canon Digital IXUS 400 (PowerShot ELPH S400 in North America and IXY Digital 400 in Japan) featured:
 Maximum resolution: 2272 × 1704 (3.8 megapixels)
 Image ratio 4:3
 Memory Format Compact Flash
 ISO 50–400
 35 mm equivalent: 36 mm–108 mm
 Aperture –
 Battery NB-1LH, 3.7 V 840 mAh lithium-ion rechargeable

The internal wiring of the CCD can become disconnected in high-temperature or high-humidity environments. Canon issued a recall in October 2006. The damaged CCD displays purple or blueish, distorted or possibly no image at all. The menu and pictures taken prior to the CCD disconnect will still display normally.

The camera also incorrectly reports a problem with the memory card (Memory Card Error message). This problem can be temporarily overcome by removing both the main battery as well as the small internal battery. Canon has acknowledged this issue, and formerly repaired free of charge.

IXUS 430
The Canon Digital IXUS 430 is (PowerShot ELPH S410 in North America and IXY Digital 450 in Japan) featured
4.0 megapixels, 3x zoom lens, and i3 minute videos with sound.

There has been a Service Notice by Canon stating that the vendor supplied CCD image sensor used in this camera can cause a malfunction. The affected cameras (s410) show the symptoms such as a corrupted image, lines going across the LCD screen, lack of color of the image produced, or no image produced. Shots by the camera will also display these symptoms. In Canon's service notice they also stated the following: "Effective immediately, and regardless of warranty status, Canon will repair, free of charge, products exhibiting the above-mentioned malfunction if the malfunction is caused by the CCD image sensor. Canon will also cover the cost of shipping and handling in connection with this repair."

IXUS/ELPH/IXY cameras using SD storage

The PowerShot Digital ELPH using SD had SDxxx or SDxxxx model number prior to 2011 models' introduction.

IXUS i/ELPH SDxx/IXY L Cameras

Accessories
IXUS: AW-PS200 all-weather enclosure
IXUS 330: WP-DC500 waterproof enclosure
IXUS 400/430/500: WP-DC800 waterproof enclosure
IXUS i: AW-DC10 all-weather enclosure
IXUS 50: AW-DC30 all-weather enclosure
IXUS 55: AW-DC50 all-weather enclosure
SD700 IS: WP-DC5 waterproof enclosure
External flash: High-Power Flash HF-DC1

Known problems
A firmware bug exists that can cause the IXUS 400 (and possibly other cameras with the same firmware) to display a "Memory card error" message after the camera has been in use for some time. Contrary to the message, there may not actually be anything wrong with the memory card. Descriptions of the fix recommend simultaneously removing the internal and external batteries to reset the camera. Canon has acknowledged this issue and formerly repaired it free of charge.

A number of camera models across several manufacturers used a Sony CCD that was prone to failure. Canon put out a general recall in late 2005 on affected models and serial numbers. Models from the IXUS range are the v3, II, and IIs.  Canon has issued a support advisory stating it will repair affected cameras free of charge. This free repair service for Canon cameras with defective CCD image sensors is gradually being phased out; in the UK, the free service end date for IXUS II cameras was 31 January 2011.

Like all compacts with a zoom lens, cameras in the IXUS range are susceptible to the "lens error" message if the lens is physically unable to zoom in or out. On Canon cameras, this manifests as the E18 error or the message "Lens error, restart camera" on more recent models.

Sample shots

All images here are the original camera JPEG with original Exif information, unmodified except for lossless rotation.

See also
Canon PowerShot
List of Canon products

Notes
Note 1: The PC1001 was marketed as "Digital IXUS," "IXY Digital" and "PowerShot S100 Digital ELPH."

References

External links

Digital Compact Cameras (Canon Europe)

IXUS
Cameras introduced in 2000